Moët & Chandon is a French fine winery and co-owner of the luxury goods company LVMH Moët Hennessy Louis Vuitton SE.

Moët, moet, MOET, or variation, may also refer to:

People
 Moet Abebe (born 1989), Nigerian entertainer
 Claude Moët (1683–1760), French vintner
 Jean-Rémy Moët (1758–1841), French vintner and merchant seaman
 Michèle Moet-Agniel (born 1926), teacher and member of the French Resistance

Other uses
 Ministry of Economy and Trade (Lebanon) (MOET)

See also

 Moet Hennessy Louis Vuitton (LVMH)

 
 Moest (disambiguation)